David Gold may refer to:

David Gold, Baron Gold (born 1951), British lawyer and Conservative life peer in the House of Lords
David Gold (bridge), English bridge player
David Gold (businessman) (1936–2023), English businessman
David Gold (talk radio host), American conservative talk radio host
David Gold (1980–2011), leader of the band Woods of Ypres
Dave Gold (1932–2013), founder of 99 Cents Only chain
David Gold (footballer) (born 1993), Scottish footballer

See also
 Gold (surname)